Rizky Ridho Ramadhani (born 21 November 2001) is an Indonesian professional footballer who plays as a centre back for Liga 1 club Persebaya Surabaya and the Indonesia national team.

Club career

Persebaya Surabaya 
Since 2018 to 2019, Rizky Ridho is a player from the Persebaya academy, he joined the Persebaya U20 squad that competed in the 2019 Liga 1 U-20. As a result, he became a core player in the team that won the event under coach Uston Nawawi, his impressive performance, he was promoted to the senior team in 2020. He made his Persebaya debut in a friendly match against Persis Solo at Gelora Bung Tomo Stadium on 11 January 2020. Rizky Ridho made his league debut for Persebaya Surabaya on 13 March 2020 as a starter in a match against Persipura Jayapura in the 2020 Liga 1 competition that ended after three matches due to the COVID-19 pandemic.

On 4 September 2021, Rizky Ridho started his match in the 2021 new season for Persebaya Surabaya in a 3–1 lose over Borneo, he playing as a starter and played the full 90 minutes. Since joining the club from 2019, he became a first team regular for the side, playing mostly in the centre–back position, by the end of the 2021–22 season, Rizky Ridho had made 18 appearances and without scored in the league.

Ahead of the 2022–23 season, Rizky Ridho was linked with a move to several Thai League 1 side, but he eventually stayed at the club. Despite this, Rizky Ridho became a regular starter for Persebaya under coach Aji Santoso, and saw an improvement in his performances for the side in the number of matches. On 1 August 2022, Rizky Ridho scored his first league goal for Persebaya in a 2–0 home victory to Persita Tangerang, in which he scored a free header from a corner.

On 18 January 2023, Rizky Ridho scored from a free-kick in a 0–5 away win against Persita at Indomilk Arena. Five days later, Rizky Ridho scored an equalizer towards the end of the first half in the 41st minute, and until the end of the match, the score was 2-1 for Persebaya's victory over Bhayangkara at Gelora Joko Samudro Stadium.

International career
Rizky Ridho debuted for the Indonesia U-19 team in the 2019 AFF U-19 Youth Championship and captained the U-19 squad when it faced Bulgaria U-19 in a friendly on 5 September 2020. He received a call to join the senior Indonesian national football team in May 2021. He earned his first cap in a friendly match against Oman on 29 May 2021.

Rizky Ridho became the youngest center back to play in the FIFA World Cup qualification for the Indonesian national team since 1986 FIFA World Cup qualification. He played against Thailand on 3 June 2021 at the age of 19 years 7 months and 10 days. Rizky Ridho is younger than his senior, Bejo Sugiantoro, who is the father of his fellow Indonesia international Rachmat Irianto. Bejo was 20 years 2 months and 18 days when he first played in 1997 against Uzbekistan at the 1998 FIFA World Cup Qualification.

Career statistics

Club

Notes

International

International goals
International under-23 goals

Honours

Club 
 Persebaya Surabaya
 East Java Governor Cup: 2020

Persebaya Surabaya U-20
 Elite Pro Academy U-20: 2019

International 
 Indonesia U-19
 AFF U-19 Youth Championship third place: 2019

 Indonesia U-23
 Southeast Asian Games  Bronze medal: 2021

Indonesia
 AFF Championship runner-up: 2020

References

External links 
 Rizky Ridho at pssi.org
 Rizky Ridho at persebaya.id
 

2001 births
Living people
People from Surabaya
Sportspeople from Surabaya
Sportspeople from East Java
Indonesian footballers
Indonesia youth international footballers
Indonesia international footballers
Liga 1 (Indonesia) players
Persebaya Surabaya players
Association football defenders
Competitors at the 2021 Southeast Asian Games
Southeast Asian Games bronze medalists for Indonesia
Southeast Asian Games medalists in football
21st-century Indonesian people